Szilárd Jansik (born 6 April 1994) is a Hungarian water polo player. He competed in the 2020 Summer Olympics.

References

1994 births
Living people
Sportspeople from Szeged
People from Cegléd
Water polo players at the 2020 Summer Olympics
Hungarian male water polo players
Medalists at the 2020 Summer Olympics
Olympic bronze medalists for Hungary in water polo
21st-century Hungarian people